Lepa Gora (Serbian Cyrillic: Лепа гора) is a mountain in southern Serbia, near the town of Kuršumlija. Its highest peak Crna čuka has an elevation of 1196 meters above sea level.

References

Mountains of Serbia
Rhodope mountain range